Guadaloupe Loma (born 12 December 1967) is a Mexican long-distance runner. She competed in the women's marathon at the 1996 Summer Olympics.

References

External links
 

1967 births
Living people
Athletes (track and field) at the 1996 Summer Olympics
Mexican female long-distance runners
Mexican female marathon runners
Olympic athletes of Mexico
Place of birth missing (living people)
20th-century Mexican women